Skiatophytum is a genus of flowering plants belonging to the family Aizoaceae.

Its native range is South African Republic.

Species:

Skiatophytum flaccidifolium 
Skiatophytum skiatophytoides 
Skiatophytum tripolium

References

Aizoaceae
Aizoaceae genera
Taxa named by Louisa Bolus